Miss La Libertad is a beauty contest that selects the representative for the La Libertad Region in the Miss Peru pageant. The current titleholder is Paola Rodríguez Larraín, who was crowned in April, 2012. The event is held annually, generally in Trujillo city. In 2012, it was held in the Plaza de Armas in the historic centre of Trujillo.

Organization
Recent events have been organized by Isa Torres Castillo in several locations, such as the traditional Club Libertad, the ancient citadel of Chan Chan, Huanchaco beach and  the historical Plaza de Armas.

Winners 

1 Age at the time of the Miss La Libertad pageant

Gallery

See also
Trujillo Spring Festival
San Jose Festival
Trujillo Book Festival
International Festival of Lyric Singing
Trujillo
Santiago de Huamán
Victor Larco Herrera District
Gastronomic Fair in Trujillo

External links
Map of Trujillo city

Media

References

Festivals in Trujillo, Peru